In the Heat of the Night is a 1967 American neo-noir mystery drama film directed by Norman Jewison. It is based on John Ball's 1965 novel of the same name and tells the story of Virgil Tibbs, a Black police detective from Philadelphia, who becomes involved in a murder investigation in a small town in Mississippi. It stars Sidney Poitier and Rod Steiger, and was produced by Walter Mirisch. The screenplay was written by Stirling Silliphant.

At the 40th Academy Awards the film was nominated for seven Oscars, winning five including Best Picture and Best Actor for Steiger. The quote "They call me Mister Tibbs! was listed as number 16 on the American Film Institute's 100 Years...100 Movie Quotes, a list of top film quotes. The film also appears on AFI's 100 Years...100 Movies, a list of the 100 greatest movies in American cinema. In 2002, the film was selected for preservation in the United States National Film Registry by the Library of Congress as being "culturally, historically, or aesthetically significant".

Plot

Wealthy industrialist Phillip Colbert moves to Sparta, Mississippi, to build a factory. Late one night, police officer Sam Wood discovers Colbert's murdered body lying in the street. Wood finds Virgil Tibbs, a Black man with a fat wallet, at the train station and arrests him. Police chief Gillespie accuses him of murder and robbery but soon learns Tibbs is a top homicide detective from Philadelphia, Pennsylvania, who was visiting his mother. Tibbs wants to leave town on the next train, but his boss suggests he stay in Sparta to help with the murder investigation. Though Gillespie, like many of Sparta's white residents, is racist, he and Tibbs reluctantly agree to work together.

A doctor estimates that Colbert had been dead for less than an hour when his body was found. Tibbs examines the body and concludes the murder happened earlier than the doctor thought, the killer was right-handed, and the victim had been killed elsewhere and moved to where Wood found his body.

Gillespie arrests another suspect, Harvey Oberst, who protests his innocence. The police plan to beat him to extract a confession, but Tibbs reveals Oberst is left-handed and has witnesses to confirm his alibi.  Frustrated by the ineptitude of the local police but impressed by Tibbs, Colbert's widow threatens to halt construction of the factory unless Tibbs leads the investigation, so the town's leading citizens are forced to comply with her demand.

Tibbs initially suspects the murderer is plantation owner Endicott, a genteel racist and one of the town's most powerful citizens, who publicly opposed Colbert's new factory. When Tibbs interrogates him, Endicott slaps him in the face. Tibbs slaps him back, so Endicott sends a gang of thugs after him. Gillespie rescues him and tells him to leave town to save himself, but Tibbs is convinced he can solve the case.

Tibbs asks Wood to re-trace his patrol car route during the night of the murder; Gillespie joins them. After questioning why Wood partially detours from his patrol route, Tibbs finds that Wood enjoys passing by the house of 16-year-old Delores Purdy, with its bright lights and unobscured windows, to watch her undress. Gillespie discovers that Wood made a sizable deposit to his bank account the day after the murder. He arrests Wood, despite Tibbs's protests that he is not the murderer. Tibbs tells Gillespie that the murder was committed at the site of the planned factory, which clears Wood because he could not have driven both his and Colbert's cars back into town.  Also, while being interrogated Wood provides a credible account of where the money for his large deposit could have come from.

Delores' brother Mr. Purdy, a hostile local, brings her to the police station and files statutory rape charges against Wood for getting her pregnant. When Tibbs insists on being present during Delores' questioning, Purdy is offended that a Black man is present during her interrogation and soon afterwards gathers a mob to attack Tibbs.

Tibbs pressures illegal abortionist Mama Caleba to reveal that she is about to provide an abortion for Delores. When she arrives and sees Tibbs, Delores runs away. Tibbs follows her and confronts her armed boyfriend, Ralph, a cook at a local roadside diner. Purdy's mob also arrives and holds Tibbs at gunpoint.

Tibbs tells Purdy to check Delores' purse for the money Ralph gave her for an abortion, which he got from killing and robbing Colbert. Purdy realizes Tibbs is right when he examines the purse. After Purdy confronts him for getting his sister pregnant, Ralph shoots Purdy dead. Tibbs grabs Ralph's gun as Gillespie arrives on the scene. Ralph is arrested and confesses to the killing of Colbert. After hitchhiking a ride with Colbert and asking him for a job, Ralph attacked him at the construction site of the new factory, intending only to knock Colbert unconscious and rob him, but instead accidentally killing him.

Tibbs arrives at the station to meet his train to go to Philadelphia, as Gillespie, having carried his suitcase, shakes Tibbs' hand and bids him farewell.  In the final interaction between Gillespie and Tibbs, as the detective ascends the stairs onto the train, for one last time Gillespie calls out to him and sincerely tells Tibbs "you take care...you hear?". Next, after a moment of hesitation, Tibbs turns around to face Gillespie and offers Gillespie a warm smile in reply.  Gillespie then smiles back at Tibbs as Tibbs boards the train and as the train pulls away from the station finally bound for Philadelphia.

Cast

Cast notes:
 His unbilled appearance in this film was Clegg Hoyt's final acting role. He died two months after the film's release.

Production
Although the film was set in Sparta, Mississippi, most of the movie was filmed in Sparta, Illinois, where many of the film's landmarks can still be seen.

Jewison, Poitier, and Steiger worked together and got along well during the filming, but Jewison had problems with the Southern authorities, and Poitier had reservations about coming south of the Mason–Dixon line for filming. Despite their reservations, Jewison decided to shoot part of the film in Dyersburg and Union City, Tennessee anyway, while the rest was filmed in Sparta, Chester (Harvey Oberst chase scene), and Freeburg (Compton's diner), Illinois.

The scene of Tibbs slapping Endicott is not present in the novel. According to Poitier, the scene was almost not in the movie. In the textbook Civil Rights and Race Relations in the USA, Poitier states: "I said, 'I'll tell you what, I'll make this movie for you if you give me your absolute guarantee when he slaps me I slap him right back and you guarantee that it will play in every version of this movie. I try not to do things that are against nature." Mark Harris, in his book, Pictures at a Revolution, states that copies of the original draft of the screenplay clearly depict the scene as filmed, which has been confirmed by both Jewison and Silliphant. Nevertheless, Poitier is correct that Tibbs' slapping of Endicott was not originally envisioned. After Endicott's slap, Silliphant's initial step-outline reads: "Tibbs has all he can do to restrain himself. The butler drops his head, starts to pray. 'For him, Uncle Tom', Tibbs says furiously, 'not for me! Tibbs' counter slap first appears in Silliphant's revised step-outline.

Tibbs urging the butler to pray for Endicott was part of Silliphant's adaptation of In the Heat of the Night as a subversive Christian allegory, featuring Tibbs as the messianic outsider who confronts the racist establishment of Sparta.

The film is also important for being the first major Hollywood film in color that was lit with proper consideration for a Black person. Haskell Wexler recognized that standard strong lighting used in filming tended to produce too much glare on dark complexions and rendered the features indistinct. Accordingly, Wexler adjusted the lighting to feature Poitier with better photographic results.

Music

The film score was composed, arranged and conducted by Quincy Jones, and the soundtrack album was released on the United Artists label in 1967. The title song performed by Ray Charles, composed by Quincy Jones, with lyrics by Alan and Marilyn Bergman was released as a single by ABC Records and reached #33 on the Billboard Hot 100 chart and #21 on the Hot Rhythm & Blues Singles chart.

AllMusic's Steven McDonald said the soundtrack had "a tone of righteous fury woven throughout" and that "the intent behind In the Heat of the Night was to get a Southern, blues-inflected atmosphere to support the angry, anti-racist approach of the picture ... although the cues from In the Heat of the Night show their age". The Vinyl Factory said "this soundtrack to a film about racism in the South has a cool, decidedly Southern-fried sound with funk-bottomed bluesy touches, like on the strutting 'Cotton Curtain', the down 'n' dirty 'Whipping Boy' or the fat 'n' sassy 'Chief's Drive to Mayor'".

Track listing
All compositions by Quincy Jones
 "In the Heat of the Night' (Lyrics by Alan and Marilyn Bergman) – 2:30
 "Peep-Freak Patrol Car" – 1:30
 "Cotton Curtain" – 2:33
 "Where Whitey Ain't Around" – 1:11
 "Whipping Boy" – 1:25
 "No You Won't" – 1:34
 "Nitty Gritty Time" – 1:50
 "It Sure Is Groovy!" – 2:30 (Lyrics by Alan and Marilyn Bergman)
 "Bowlegged Polly" – 2:30 (Lyrics by Alan and Marilyn Bergman)
 "Shag Bag, Hounds & Harvey" – 3:28
 "Chief's Drive to Mayor" —1:10
 "Give Me Until Morning" – 1:09
 "On Your Feet, Boy!" – 1:37
 "Blood & Roots" – 1:07
 "Mama Caleba's Blues" – 5:00
 "Foul Owl [on the Prowl]" – 2:30 (Lyrics by Alan and Marilyn Bergman)

Personnel
 Unidentified orchestra arranged and conducted by Quincy Jones including
 Ray Charles – vocals (track 1), piano (track 15)
 Glen Campbell – vocals (track 9), banjo
 Boomer and Travis (track 16), Gil Bernal (track 8) – vocals
 Roland Kirk – flute
 Bobby Scott – tack piano
 Billy Preston – electric organ (track 1)
 Ray Brown – bass
 Carol Kaye – electric bass
 Don Elliott – human instrument
 The Raelettes – backing vocals (track 1)

Reception
In contrast to films like The Chase and Hurry Sundown, which offered confused visions of the South, In the Heat of the Night depicted a tough, edgy vision of a Southern town that seemed to hate outsiders more than itself, a theme reflecting the uncertain mood of the time, just as the civil rights movement attempted to take hold. Canadian director Jewison wanted to tell an anti-racist story of a white man and a Black man working together in spite of difficulties. Jewison said that this film proved a conviction he had held for a long time: "It's you against the world. It's like going to war. Everybody is trying to tell you something different and they are always putting obstacles in your way."

A particularly famous line in the film comes immediately after Gillespie mocks the name "Virgil": Gillespie: "That's a funny name for a nigger boy that comes from Philadelphia! What do they call you up there?" (An annoyed) Tibbs: "They call me Mister Tibbs!" This reply was later listed as number 16 on the American Film Institute's 100 Years...100 Movie Quotes, a list of top film quotes, and was also the title of the movie's sequel.

Another important scene that surprised audiences at the time occurs when Tibbs is slapped by Endicott. Tibbs responds by immediately slapping him back. In a San Francisco pre-screening, Jewison was concerned when the young audience was laughing at the film as if it were a comedy. The audience's stunned reaction to the slapping scene convinced Jewison that the film was effective as drama. That scene helped make the film so popular for audiences, finally seeing the top Black film actor physically strike back against bigotry, that the film earned the nickname, Superspade Versus the Rednecks. During the film's initial run, Steiger and Poitier occasionally went to the Capitol Theatre in New York to amuse themselves seeing how many Black and white audience members there were, which could be immediately ascertained by listening to the former cheering Tibbs's retaliatory slap and the latter whispering "Oh!" in astonishment.

Critical response
Bosley Crowther of The New York Times praised Jewison for crafting "a film that has the look and sound of actuality and the pounding pulse of truth." He further praised Steiger and Poitier for "each giving physical authority and personal depth" to their performances. Richard Schickel of Life magazine wrote that "almost everything in this movie is good—the sharply drawn minor characters, the careful plotting, the wonderful rightness of each scene's setting, mood and dialogue. Most admirable of all is the way everyone avoids oversimplifications." John Mahoney of The Hollywood Reporter deemed the film to be "a gripping and suspenseful murder mystery that effects a feeling of greater importance by its veneer of social significance and the illusion of depth in its use of racial color."

Time magazine applauded the film's theme of racial unity that was "immeasurably helped by performances from Steiger and Poitier that break brilliantly with black-white stereotype." Roger Ebert gave In the Heat of the Night a positive review, praising Steiger's performance although he noted "the story itself was slightly too pat". He would later place it at number ten on his top ten list of 1967 films. Arthur D. Murphy of Variety felt that the excellent Poitier and outstanding Steiger performances overcame noteworthy flaws, including an uneven script. Penelope Gilliatt of The New Yorker thought it had "a spurious air of concern about the afflictions of the real America at the moment" and that it is "essentially a primitive rah-rah story about an underdog's triumph over a bully".

Akira Kurosawa cited In the Heat of the Night as one of his favorite films.

On the review aggregator website Rotten Tomatoes, the film holds an approval rating of 95% based on 88 reviews, with an average rating of 8.40/10. Its consensus states, "Tense, funny, and thought-provoking all at once, and lifted by strong performances from Sydney Poitier and Rod Steiger, director Norman Jewison's look at murder and racism in small-town America continues to resonate today." Metacritic assigned a score of 75 based on 14 reviews, indicating "generally favorable reviews".

Box office
The film opened at the Capitol Theatre and at the 86th Street East theatre in New York City on Wednesday, August 2, 1967, grossing $108,107 in its first five days. It opened in Miami Beach, Florida and in Toronto on Friday, August 4 and grossed $20,974 for the weekend which, together with the New York grosses, combined to give a weekend gross of $95,806. It was released soon after race riots in Newark, Milwaukee, and Detroit. By January 1971, the film had earned $11 million in box office rentals from the United States and Canada.

Accolades

Legacy
In 2003, In the Heat of the Night was selected by The New York Times as one of the 1000 Best Movies Ever Made.

American Film Institute recognition
The film appears on several 100 Years lists by the American Film Institute.

 AFI's 100 Years...100 Movies – Nominated
 AFI's 100 Years...100 Movies (10th Anniversary Edition): #75
 AFI's 100 Years...100 Heroes & Villains:
 Virgil Tibbs: #19 Hero
 AFI's 100 Years...100 Movie Quotes:
 Virgil Tibbs: "They call me Mister Tibbs!": #16
 AFI's 100 Years...100 Cheers: #21
 AFI's 100 Years...100 Songs:
 "In the Heat of the Night", song by Ray Charles and Quincy Jones – Nominated
 AFI's 100 Years of Film Scores – Nominated
 AFI's 10 Top 10 – Nominated Mystery Film

Preservation
The Academy Film Archive preserved In the Heat of the Night in 1997. In 2002, the film was selected for preservation in the United States National Film Registry by the Library of Congress as being "culturally, historically, or aesthetically significant".

Home media
In the Heat of the Night was first released on DVD in 2001. The only extras in that release were the theatrical trailer, and audio commentary with Norman Jewison, Haskell Wexler, Rod Steiger and Lee Grant.

Another DVD was released in 2008 to coincide the film's 40th Anniversary.

In 2010, the film was digitized in High Definition (1080i) and broadcast on MGM HD.

MGM released the film on Blu-ray on January 14, 2014 through 20th Century Fox. The release ports over all the extras from the 2001 and 40th Anniversary DVDs.

Another DVD and Blu-ray were released by The Criterion Collection on January 29, 2019. The release contained new and previously released extras.

Kino Lorber released In the Heat of the Night as a two-disc 4K Ultra HD/Blu-ray set on April 19, 2022. The main disc includes the UHD SDR version of the film plus two audio commentaries including the 2001 commentary and a brand new commentary featuring historians Steve Mitchell and Nathaniel Thompson, and Robert Mirisch. The special features Blu-ray contained the sequels They Call Me Mister Tibbs! and The Organization in addition to the 40th Anniversary extras, and theatrical trailers for all three films.

Sequels and adaptations
The film was followed by two sequels with Poitier, They Call Me Mister Tibbs! (1970) and The Organization (1971). Both films still did fairly well at the box office though to less critical acclaim. It was also the basis of a 1988 television series adaptation of the same name.

See also
 List of American films of 1967

References
Informational notes

Citations

Bibliography

External links

 In the Heat of the Night essay by Michael Schlesinger at National Film Registry 
 In the Heat of the Night essay by Daniel Eagan in America's Film Legacy: The Authoritative Guide to the Landmark Movies in the National Film Registry, A&C Black, 2010 , pages 624-626 
 
 
 
 
 
 In the Heat of the Night: The Double Bind an essay by K. Austin Collins at the Criterion Collection

1967 films
1967 crime drama films
American crime drama films
1960s English-language films
Films directed by Norman Jewison
Best Drama Picture Golden Globe winners
Best Picture Academy Award winners
Edgar Award-winning works
Films scored by Quincy Jones
Films about murder
Films about prejudice
Films about race and ethnicity
Films adapted into television shows
Films based on American novels
Films based on crime novels
Films featuring a Best Actor Academy Award-winning performance
Films featuring a Best Drama Actor Golden Globe winning performance
Films produced by Walter Mirisch
Films set in Mississippi
Films shot in Illinois
Films shot in Tennessee
Films that won the Best Sound Mixing Academy Award
Films whose editor won the Best Film Editing Academy Award
Films whose writer won the Best Adapted Screenplay Academy Award
American police detective films
United States National Film Registry films
Films with screenplays by Stirling Silliphant
Fictional portrayals of the Philadelphia Police Department
African-American films
1960s buddy cop films
Virgil Tibbs
1960s American films